In organic chemistry, phenols, sometimes called phenolics, are a class of chemical compounds consisting of one or more hydroxyl groups (−OH) bonded directly to an aromatic hydrocarbon group. The simplest is phenol, . Phenolic compounds are classified as simple phenols or polyphenols based on the number of phenol units in the molecule.

Phenols are both synthesized industrially and produced by plants and microorganisms.

Properties

Acidity
Phenols are more acidic than typical alcohols. The acidity of the hydroxyl group in phenols is commonly intermediate between that of aliphatic alcohols and carboxylic acids (their pKa is usually between 10 and 12). Deprotonation of a phenol forms a corresponding negative phenolate ion or phenoxide ion, and the corresponding salts are called phenolates or phenoxides (aryloxides according to the IUPAC Gold Book).

Condensation with aldehydes and ketones
Phenols are susceptible to Electrophilic aromatic substitutions. Condensation with formaldehyde gives resinous materials, famously Bakelite.

Another industrial-scale electrophilic aromatic substitution is the production of bisphenol A, which is produced  by the condensation with acetone.

C-Alkylation with alkenes
Phenol is readily alkylated at the ortho positions using alkenes in the presence of a Lewis acid such as aluminium phenoxide:
 CH2=CR2  +  C6H5OH  →  R2CHCH2-2-C6H4OH 
More than 100,000 tons of tert-butyl phenols are produced annually (year: 2000) in this way, using isobutylene (CH2=CMe2) as the alkylating agent.  Especially important is 2,6-ditert-butylphenol, a versatile antioxidant.

Other reactions
Phenols undergo esterification.  Phenol esters are active esters, being prone to hydrolysis. Phenols are reactive species toward oxidation. Oxidative cleavage, for instance cleavage of 1,2-dihydroxybenzene to the monomethylester of 2,4 hexadienedioic acid with oxygen, copper chloride in pyridine Oxidative de-aromatization to quinones also known as the Teuber reaction. and oxone. In reaction depicted below 3,4,5-trimethylphenol reacts with singlet oxygen generated from oxone/sodium carbonate in an acetonitrile/water mixture to a para-peroxyquinole. This hydroperoxide is reduced to the quinole with sodium thiosulfate.

Phenols are oxidized to hydroquinones in the Elbs persulfate oxidation.

Reaction of naphtols and hydrazines and sodium bisulfite in the Bucherer carbazole synthesis.

Synthesis
Many phenols of commercial interest are prepared by elaboration of phenol or cresols. In addition to the reactions above, many other more specialized reactions produce phenols:
 rearrangement of  esters in the Fries rearrangement
 rearrangement of N-phenylhydroxylamines in the Bamberger rearrangement
 dealkylation of phenolic ethers
 reduction of quinones
 replacement of an aromatic amine by an hydroxyl group with water and sodium bisulfide in the Bucherer reaction
thermal decomposition of aryl diazonium salts, the salts are converted to phenol
 by the oxidation of aryl silanes—an aromatic variation of the Fleming-Tamao oxidation
catalytic synthesis from aryl bromides and iodides using nitrous oxide

Classification 

There are various classification schemes.  A commonly used scheme is based on the number of carbons and was devised by Jeffrey Harborne and Simmonds in 1964 and published in 1980:

Drugs and bioactive natural products
More than 371 drugs approved by the FDA between the years of 1951 and 2020 contain either a phenol or a phenolic ether (a phenol with an alkyl), with nearly every class of small molecule drugs being represented, and natural products making up a large portion of this list.

References

 
Functional groups
Disinfectants